The 1944 Taça de Portugal Final was the final match of the 1943–44 Taça de Portugal, the 6th season of the Taça de Portugal, the premier Portuguese football cup competition organized by the Portuguese Football Federation (FPF). The match was played on 28 May 1944 at the Campo das Salésias in Lisbon, and opposed Primeira Liga side Benfica and Portuguese Second Division side Estoril. Benfica defeated Estoril 8–0 to claim their third Taça de Portugal.

Match

Details

References

1944
Taca
S.L. Benfica matches
G.D. Estoril Praia